Kennedy Kanyanta (born April 10, 1979 in Mufulira, Copperbelt) is a Zambian boxer who won the 2002 Commonwealth Games in the men's flyweight division and bronze at the 2007 AllAfrica Games as an amateur.

Amateur
At the Olympics 2000 he had a bye, and  then lost his bout against Bulat Jumadilov 9:12. In Manchester at the Commonwealth Games 2002 he beat Lechedzani Luza in the final. (see Boxing at the 2002 Commonwealth Games)

Luza returned the favor at the 2006 Games.

At the AllAfricans 2007 he lost to Jackson Chauke.

Pro
He turned pro in 2007 and won 2 bouts at bantamweight.

References
Data
Pro record
sports-reference

Living people
1979 births
People from Mufulira
Flyweight boxers
Boxers at the 2000 Summer Olympics
Boxers at the 2002 Commonwealth Games
Olympic boxers of Zambia
Commonwealth Games gold medallists for Zambia
Zambian male boxers
Commonwealth Games medallists in boxing
African Games bronze medalists for Zambia
African Games medalists in boxing
Competitors at the 2007 All-Africa Games
African Boxing Union champions
Medallists at the 2002 Commonwealth Games